4-hydroxycoumarin synthase (BIS2, BIS3) is an enzyme with systematic name malonyl-CoA:2-hydroxybenzoyl-CoA malonyltransferase. This enzyme catalyses the following chemical reaction

 malonyl-CoA + 2-hydroxybenzoyl-CoA  2 CoA + 4-hydroxycoumarin + CO2

This polyketide synthase can also accept benzoyl-CoA as substrate.

References

External links 
 

EC 2.3.1